This is a list of 620 species in Rhamphomyia, a genus of dance flies in the family Empididae.

Rhamphomyia species

 Rhamphomyia acuta Bartak, 2002 c g
 Rhamphomyia adversa Coquillett, 1900 i c g
 Rhamphomyia aethiops Zetterstedt, 1838 c g
 Rhamphomyia agasciles Walker, 1849 i c g
 Rhamphomyia alameda Bartak, 2002 c g
 Rhamphomyia albata Coquillett, 1902 i c g
 Rhamphomyia albibasis Frey, 1935 c g
 Rhamphomyia albidipennis Malloch, 1930 c g
 Rhamphomyia albidiventris Strobl, 1898 c g
 Rhamphomyia albipennis (Fallen, 1816) c g
 Rhamphomyia albissima Frey, 1913 c g
 Rhamphomyia albitarsis Collin, 1926 c g
 Rhamphomyia albogeniculata Roser, 1840 c g
 Rhamphomyia albohirta Collin, 1926 c g
 Rhamphomyia albonigra Frey, 1950 c g
 Rhamphomyia albopilosa Coquillett, 1900 i c g
 Rhamphomyia albosegmentata Zetterstedt, 1838 c g
 Rhamphomyia alpina (Zetterstedt, 1838) c g
 Rhamphomyia alpiniformis Frey, 1950 c g
 Rhamphomyia ambocnema Chillcott, 1959 i c g
 Rhamphomyia americana Wiedemann, 1830 i c g
 Rhamphomyia amoena Loew, 1840 c g
 Rhamphomyia ampla Frey, 1952 c g
 Rhamphomyia amplicella Coquillett, 1895 i c g
 Rhamphomyia amplipedis Coquillett, 1895 i c g
 Rhamphomyia andalusiaca Strobl, 1899 c g
 Rhamphomyia anfractuosa Bezzi, 1904 c g
 Rhamphomyia angulifera Frey, 1913 c g
 Rhamphomyia angustifacies Saigusa, 1964 c g
 Rhamphomyia angustipennis Loew, 1861 i c g
 Rhamphomyia anomala Oldenberg, 1915 c g
 Rhamphomyia anomalina Zetterstedt, 1838 c g
 Rhamphomyia anomalipennis Meigen, 1822 c g
 Rhamphomyia antennata Frey, 1915 c g
 Rhamphomyia anthracina Meigen, 1822 c g
 Rhamphomyia anthracinella Strobl, 1898 c g
 Rhamphomyia anthracodes Coquillett, 1900 i c g
 Rhamphomyia aperta Loew i c g
 Rhamphomyia appendens Bartak, 2002 c g
 Rhamphomyia appendiculata Macquart, 1827 c g
 Rhamphomyia aprilis White, 1916 c g
 Rhamphomyia aquaria Bartak, 2002 c g
 Rhamphomyia arakawae Matsumura, 1915 c g
 Rhamphomyia araneipes Frey, 1951 c g
 Rhamphomyia arctotibia Chillcott, 1959 i c g
 Rhamphomyia arcuata Coquillett, 1895 i c g
 Rhamphomyia argentata Roder, 1887 c g
 Rhamphomyia argyrina Bezzi, 1909 c g
 Rhamphomyia argyrosoma Saigusa, 1963 c g
 Rhamphomyia ariiorum Saigusa, 1964 c g
 Rhamphomyia armata Becker, 1915 c g
 Rhamphomyia armimana Oldenberg, 1910 c g
 Rhamphomyia armipes Sack, 1923 c g
 Rhamphomyia arnaudorum Bartak, 2002 c g
 Rhamphomyia articularis Bartak, 2002 c g
 Rhamphomyia astragala Bartak, 2002 c g
 Rhamphomyia aterrima Frey, 1922 c g
 Rhamphomyia atra Meigen, 1822 c g
 Rhamphomyia atrata Coquillett, 1900 i c g
 Rhamphomyia aucta Oldenberg, 1917 c g
 Rhamphomyia auricoma Bartak, 2002 c g
 Rhamphomyia auripilosa Saigusa, 1964 c g
 Rhamphomyia australis Frey, 1922 c g
 Rhamphomyia aversa Frey, 1950 c g
 Rhamphomyia azauensis Bartak, 1983 c g
 Rhamphomyia baicalensis Frey, 1950 c g
 Rhamphomyia barbata (Macquart, 1823) c g
 Rhamphomyia barbipalpis Frey, 1950 c g
 Rhamphomyia barypoda Coquillett, 1900 i c g
 Rhamphomyia basalis Loew, 1864 i c g
 Rhamphomyia basisetosa Saigusa, 1966 c g
 Rhamphomyia basispinosa Frey, 1950 c g
 Rhamphomyia batylimensis Frey, 1922 c g
 Rhamphomyia beckeriella Chvala, 1985 c g
 Rhamphomyia bellinosetosa Bartak, 2007 c g
 Rhamphomyia bergrothi (Kieffer, 1923) c g
 Rhamphomyia bernhardi Bartak, 2000 c g
 Rhamphomyia bicalaris Ito & Saigusa, 1967 c g
 Rhamphomyia bicolor Macquart, 1827 c g
 Rhamphomyia bicoloripes Frey, 1950 c g
 Rhamphomyia bifasciata (Rossi, 1794) c g
 Rhamphomyia bifilata Coquillett, 1895 i c g
 Rhamphomyia bigelowi Walley, 1927 i c g
 Rhamphomyia bilineata (Meigen, 1804) c g
 Rhamphomyia bipila Strobl, 1909 c g
 Rhamphomyia birdi Curran, 1929 i c g
 Rhamphomyia biroi Bezzi, 1908 c g
 Rhamphomyia biserialis (Collin, 1960) c g
 Rhamphomyia bistriata Strobl, 1910 c g
 Rhamphomyia boliviana Bezzi, 1905 c g
 Rhamphomyia borealis (Fabricius, 1780) i c g
 Rhamphomyia boreoitalica Bartak, 2006 c g
 Rhamphomyia brevicellula Saigusa, 1964 c g
 Rhamphomyia brevipila Oldenberg, 1922 c g
 Rhamphomyia brevis Loew, 1861 i c g b
 Rhamphomyia brevistylata Oldenberg, 1927 c g
 Rhamphomyia breviventris Frey, 1913 c g
 Rhamphomyia brunneostriata Frey, 1950 c g
 Rhamphomyia brussnewi Frey, 1915 c g
 Rhamphomyia bryanti Bartak, 2002 c g
 Rhamphomyia caeca Collin, 1933 c g
 Rhamphomyia caesia Meigen, 1822 c g
 Rhamphomyia calcarifera Saigusa, 1964 c g
 Rhamphomyia californica Coquillett, 1895 i c g
 Rhamphomyia caliginosa Collin, 1926 c g
 Rhamphomyia calimenda Bartak, 2002 c g
 Rhamphomyia calvimontis Cockerell, 1916 i c g
 Rhamphomyia cana Zetterstedt, 1849 c g
 Rhamphomyia candicans Loew, 1864 i c g
 Rhamphomyia candidula Collin, 1933 c g
 Rhamphomyia canella Bartak, 2002 c g
 Rhamphomyia carbonaria Wiedemann, 1822 c g
 Rhamphomyia carenifera Bezzi, 1909 c g
 Rhamphomyia carrerai Smith, 1962 c g
 Rhamphomyia catarinae Smith, 1962 c g
 Rhamphomyia caucasica Frey, 1953 c g
 Rhamphomyia caudata Zetterstedt, 1838 c g
 Rhamphomyia cavicornuta Bartak, 2002 c g
 Rhamphomyia cervi Bartak, 2006 c g
 Rhamphomyia chibinensis Frey, 1922 c g
 Rhamphomyia chimganensis Bartak, 2000 c g
 Rhamphomyia chinoptera Bezzi, 1904 c g
 Rhamphomyia chionoptera Bezzi, 1904 g
 Rhamphomyia chrysodactyla Frey, 1950 c g
 Rhamphomyia chvalai Bartak, 2000 c g
 Rhamphomyia ciliata Coquillett, 1895 i c g
 Rhamphomyia ciliatopoda Saigusa, 1963 c g
 Rhamphomyia cilipes (Say, 1823) i c g
 Rhamphomyia cimrmani Bartak, 2006 c g
 Rhamphomyia cinefacta Coquillett, 1900 i c g
 Rhamphomyia cineracea Coquillett, 1900 i c g
 Rhamphomyia cinerascens (Meigen, 1804) c g
 Rhamphomyia cinerea (Fabricius, 1775) c g
 Rhamphomyia claripennis Oldenberg, 1922 c g
 Rhamphomyia clariventris Okada, 1941 c g
 Rhamphomyia clauda Coquillett, 1901 i c g
 Rhamphomyia clavator Coquillett, 1901 i c g
 Rhamphomyia clavigera Loew, 1861 i c g
 Rhamphomyia clypeata Macquart, 1834 c g
 Rhamphomyia collini Smith, 1971 c g
 Rhamphomyia colorata Coquillett, 1895 i c g
 Rhamphomyia comosa Bartak, 2002 c g
 Rhamphomyia complicans Frey, 1953 c g
 Rhamphomyia compta Coquillett, 1895 i c g
 Rhamphomyia confinis Zetterstedt, 1852 c g
 Rhamphomyia conjuncta Loew, 1861 i c g
 Rhamphomyia contracta Bartak, 2002 c g
 Rhamphomyia cophas Walker, 1849 i c g
 Rhamphomyia coracina Zetterstedt, 1849 c g
 Rhamphomyia corvina Loew, 1861 c g
 Rhamphomyia crassicauda Strobl, 1893 c g
 Rhamphomyia crassimana Strobl, 1898 c g
 Rhamphomyia crassirostris (Fallen, 1816) c g
 Rhamphomyia cribata Oldenberg, 1927 c g
 Rhamphomyia cribrata Oldenberg, 1927 g
 Rhamphomyia crinita Becker, 1887 c g
 Rhamphomyia culicina (Fallen, 1816) c g
 Rhamphomyia cummingi Bartak, 2002 c g
 Rhamphomyia curicauda Frey, 1949 g
 Rhamphomyia currani Steyskal, 1964 i c g
 Rhamphomyia curvicauda Frey, 1949 c g
 Rhamphomyia curvinervis Oldenberg, 1915 c g
 Rhamphomyia curvipes Coquillett, 1904 i c g
 Rhamphomyia curvitibia Saigusa, 1965 c g
 Rhamphomyia curvula Frey, 1913 c g
 Rhamphomyia cyanogaster Wheeler & Melander, 1901 c g
 Rhamphomyia cymbella Frey, 1950 c g
 Rhamphomyia czizeki Bartak, 1982 c g
 Rhamphomyia dalmatica Oldenberg, 1927 c g
 Rhamphomyia dana Walker, 1849 i c g
 Rhamphomyia daria Walker, 1849 i c g
 Rhamphomyia dasycnema Bartak, 2002 c g
 Rhamphomyia dasypoda Steyskal, 1964 i c g
 Rhamphomyia debilis Loew, 1861 i c g
 Rhamphomyia deformata Frey, 1950 c g
 Rhamphomyia deformatella Bartak, 2000 c g
 Rhamphomyia deformicauda Saigusa, 1964 c g
 Rhamphomyia deformipes Saigusa, 1963 c g
 Rhamphomyia dentata Oldenberg, 1910 c g
 Rhamphomyia dimidiata Loew, 1861 i c g
 Rhamphomyia discoidalis Becker, 1889 c g
 Rhamphomyia disconcerta Curran, 1930 i c g
 Rhamphomyia disconnecta Bartak, 2002 c g
 Rhamphomyia disparilis Coquillett, 1900 i c g
 Rhamphomyia distincta Frey, 1950 c g
 Rhamphomyia diversa Coquillett, 1901 i c g
 Rhamphomyia diversipennis Becker, 1900 c g
 Rhamphomyia dombai Bartak, 1983 c g
 Rhamphomyia dorsata Becker, 1915 c g
 Rhamphomyia drahomirae Bartak, 1983 c g
 Rhamphomyia dudai Oldenberg, 1927 c g
 Rhamphomyia duplicis Coquillett, 1895 i c g
 Rhamphomyia ecetra Walker, 1849 i c g
 Rhamphomyia effera Coquillett, 1895 i c g
 Rhamphomyia eminens Collin, 1933 c g
 Rhamphomyia empidiformis Becker, 1909 c g
 Rhamphomyia enupta Bartak, 2002 c g
 Rhamphomyia erecta Bartak, 1998 c g
 Rhamphomyia erinacioides Malloch, 1919 i c g
 Rhamphomyia erythrohptalma Meigen, 1830 g
 Rhamphomyia erythrophthalma Meigen, 1830 c g
 Rhamphomyia eupterota Loew, 1873 c g
 Rhamphomyia exigua Loew, 1862 i c g
 Rhamphomyia facipennis Zetterstedt, 1838 c g
 Rhamphomyia falcipedia Chillcott, 1959 i c g
 Rhamphomyia fascipennis Zetterstedt, 1838 g
 Rhamphomyia filicauda Henriksen and Lundbeck, 1917 i c g
 Rhamphomyia filicaudula Frey, 1950 c g
 Rhamphomyia filipjefi Frey, 1950 c g
 Rhamphomyia fimbriata Coquillett, 1895 i c g
 Rhamphomyia fixus (Harris, 1776) c g
 Rhamphomyia flava (Fallen, 1816) c g
 Rhamphomyia flavipes Matsumura, 1911 c g
 Rhamphomyia flavirostris Walker, 1849 i c g
 Rhamphomyia flaviventris Macquart, 1827 c g
 Rhamphomyia flavobasalis Frey, 1951 c g
 Rhamphomyia flexuosa Coquillett, 1895 i c g
 Rhamphomyia formidabilis Frey, 1951 c g
 Rhamphomyia formosula Melander, 1965 i c g
 Rhamphomyia fortis Bartak, 2002 c g
 Rhamphomyia foveata Frey, 1950 c g
 Rhamphomyia freyi Bartak, 1985 c g
 Rhamphomyia fridolini Frey, 1950 c g
 Rhamphomyia frontalis Loew, 1862 i c g
 Rhamphomyia fulvirostris Saigusa, 1963 c g
 Rhamphomyia fulvolanata Frey, 1922 c g
 Rhamphomyia fumosa Loew, 1861 i c g
 Rhamphomyia furcifer Wheeler & Melander, 1901 c g
 Rhamphomyia fuscapicis Saigusa, 1964 c g
 Rhamphomyia fuscipennis Zetterstedt, 1838 c g
 Rhamphomyia fuscula Zetterstedt, 1838 c g
 Rhamphomyia galactodes Bezzi, 1909 c g
 Rhamphomyia galactoptera Strobl, 1893 c g
 Rhamphomyia galbanata Collin, 1933 c g
 Rhamphomyia geisha Frey, 1952 c g
 Rhamphomyia geniculata Meigen, 1830 c g
 Rhamphomyia gibba (Fallen, 1816) c g
 Rhamphomyia gibbifera Strobl, 1906 c g
 Rhamphomyia gilvipes Loew, 1861 i c g
 Rhamphomyia gilvipilosa Coquillett, 1895 i c g
 Rhamphomyia glabra Loew, 1861 i c g
 Rhamphomyia glauca Coquillett, 1900 i c g
 Rhamphomyia gracilis Walker, 1849 b
 Rhamphomyia gracilitarsis Frey, 1950 c g
 Rhamphomyia grammoptera Frey, 1922 c g
 Rhamphomyia granadensis Chvala, 1981 c g
 Rhamphomyia gripha Frey, 1935 c g
 Rhamphomyia griseola Zetterstedt, 1838 c g
 Rhamphomyia griseonigra Brunetti, 1913 c g
 Rhamphomyia gufitar Frey, 1922 c g
 Rhamphomyia hagoromo Saigusa, 1963 c g
 Rhamphomyia hambergi Frey, 1916 c g
 Rhamphomyia harpago Frey, 1952 c g
 Rhamphomyia helleni Frey, 1922 c g
 Rhamphomyia hercynica Oldenberg, 1927 c g
 Rhamphomyia herschelli Malloch, 1919 i c g
 Rhamphomyia heterochroma Bezzi, 1898 c g
 Rhamphomyia heterogyna Frey, 1952 c g
 Rhamphomyia hilariformis Frey, 1922 c g
 Rhamphomyia himalayana Brunetti, 1913 c g
 Rhamphomyia hirsutipes Collin, 1926 c g
 Rhamphomyia hirticula Collin, 1937 i c g
 Rhamphomyia hirtimana Oldenberg, 1922 c g
 Rhamphomyia hirtipes Loew, 1864 i c g
 Rhamphomyia hirtula Zetterstedt, 1842 i c g
 Rhamphomyia hoeli Frey, 1950 i c g
 Rhamphomyia horitropha Bartak, 2002 c g
 Rhamphomyia hovgaardii Holmgren, 1880 i c g
 Rhamphomyia hungarica (Weber, 1969) c g
 Rhamphomyia hyalina Brullé, 1833 c g
 Rhamphomyia hybotina Zetterstedt, 1838 c g
 Rhamphomyia idei Saigusa, 1963 c g
 Rhamphomyia idonea Bartak, 2002 c g
 Rhamphomyia ignobilis Zetterstedt, 1859 c g
 Rhamphomyia impedita Loew, 1862 i c g
 Rhamphomyia improbula Frey, 1953 c g
 Rhamphomyia incompleta Loew, 1863 i c g
 Rhamphomyia insecta Coquillett, 1895 i c g
 Rhamphomyia insignis Loew, 1871 c g
 Rhamphomyia intercedens Frey, 1950 c g
 Rhamphomyia interserta Collin, 1933 c g
 Rhamphomyia intersita Collin, 1960 c g
 Rhamphomyia intonsa Steyskal, 1964 i c g
 Rhamphomyia inyoca Bartak, 2002 c g
 Rhamphomyia ise Frey, 1953 c g
 Rhamphomyia issikii Ito, 1961 c g
 Rhamphomyia itoi Frey, 1950 c g
 Rhamphomyia janoensis Bartak, 1981 c g
 Rhamphomyia janovensis Bartak, 1981 c g
 Rhamphomyia japonica Frey, 1950 c g
 Rhamphomyia jaroslavi Bartak, 2002 c g
 Rhamphomyia jesonensis Matsumura, 1915 c g
 Rhamphomyia jubata Chillcott, 1959 i c g
 Rhamphomyia kamenuschka Bartak, 2003 c g
 Rhamphomyia kamtschatica Frey, 1922 c g
 Rhamphomyia kaninensis Frey, 1913 c g
 Rhamphomyia karamanensis Bartak, Ciftci & Hasbenli, 2007 c g
 Rhamphomyia kashiiensis Saigusa, 1964 c g
 Rhamphomyia kerteszi Oldenberg, 1927 c g
 Rhamphomyia kjellmanii Holmgren, 1880 c g
 Rhamphomyia klapperichi Frey, 1953 c g
 Rhamphomyia knutsoni Bartak, 2002 c g
 Rhamphomyia koreana Bartak, 1997 c g
 Rhamphomyia kovalevi Bartak, 2004 c g
 Rhamphomyia kozaneki Bartak, 1997 c g
 Rhamphomyia kreischi Bartak, 1998 c g
 Rhamphomyia kubiki Bartak, 2002 c g
 Rhamphomyia ladas Frey, 1955 c g
 Rhamphomyia laevigata Loew, 1861 i c g
 Rhamphomyia laevipes (Fallen, 1816) c g
 Rhamphomyia lamellata Collin, 1926 c g
 Rhamphomyia lamelliseta Ringdahl, 1928 c g
 Rhamphomyia lammifera Saigusa, 1963 c g
 Rhamphomyia lamniferella Saigusa, 1964 c g
 Rhamphomyia lapponica Frey, 1955 c g
 Rhamphomyia latifrons Frey, 1913 c g
 Rhamphomyia latilobata Bartak, 2002 c g
 Rhamphomyia latiscaura Bartak, 2002 c g
 Rhamphomyia latistriata Frey, 1953 c g
 Rhamphomyia lautereri Bartak, 1981 c g
 Rhamphomyia leptidiformis Frey, 1950 c g
 Rhamphomyia leptopus Loew, 1873 c g
 Rhamphomyia leucophenga Bezzi, 1905 c g
 Rhamphomyia leucoptera Loew, 1861 i c g
 Rhamphomyia leucopterella Saigusa, 1964 c g
 Rhamphomyia limata Coquillett, 1900 i c g
 Rhamphomyia limbata Loew, 1861 i c g
 Rhamphomyia lindneri Bartak, 1998 c g
 Rhamphomyia litoralis Saigusa, 1994 c g
 Rhamphomyia lividiventris Zetterstedt, 1838 c g
 Rhamphomyia loewi Nowicki, 1868 c g
 Rhamphomyia longefilata Strobl, 1906 c g
 Rhamphomyia longicauda Loew, 1861 i c g b  (long-tailed dance fly)
 Rhamphomyia longicornis Loew, 1861 i c g
 Rhamphomyia longidiscalis Bartak, 2002 c g
 Rhamphomyia longipennis Loew, 1861 i c g
 Rhamphomyia longipes (Meigen, 1804) c g
 Rhamphomyia longirostris (Lindner, 1972) c g
 Rhamphomyia longiseta Saigusa, 1964 c g
 Rhamphomyia longistigma Frey, 1953 c g
 Rhamphomyia loripedis Coquillett, 1895 i c g
 Rhamphomyia lucidula Zetterstedt, 1842 c g
 Rhamphomyia luctifera Loew, 1861 i c g
 Rhamphomyia luctuosa Loew, 1872 i g
 Rhamphomyia luridipennis Nowicki, 1868 c g
 Rhamphomyia luteicoxa Frey, 1953 c g
 Rhamphomyia luteiventer Curran, 1929 i g
 Rhamphomyia luteiventris Loew, 1864 i c g
 Rhamphomyia maai Saigusa, 1966 c g
 Rhamphomyia macilenta Loew, 1864 i c g
 Rhamphomyia macrura Loew, 1871 c g
 Rhamphomyia maculipennis Zetterstedt, 1842 c g
 Rhamphomyia magellensis Frey, 1922 c g
 Rhamphomyia malaisei Frey, 1935 c g
 Rhamphomyia mallos Walker, 1849 i c g
 Rhamphomyia manca Coquillett, 1895 i c g
 Rhamphomyia marginata (Fabricius, 1787) c g
 Rhamphomyia mariobezzii Bartak, 2001 c g
 Rhamphomyia maroccana Collin, 1953 c g
 Rhamphomyia melania Becker, 1887 c g
 Rhamphomyia mendicula Frey, 1950 c g
 Rhamphomyia merzi Bartak, 2000 c g
 Rhamphomyia micans Oldenberg, 1915 c g
 Rhamphomyia micrargyra Bezzi, 1909 c g
 Rhamphomyia micropyga Collin, 1926 c g
 Rhamphomyia minor Oldenberg, 1922 c g
 Rhamphomyia minutiforceps Bartak & Kubik, 2008 c g
 Rhamphomyia minutiforcipella Bartak & Kubik, 2008 c g
 Rhamphomyia minutissima Saigusa, 1964 c g
 Rhamphomyia minytus Walker, 1849 i c g
 Rhamphomyia mirabilis Saigusa, 1963 c g
 Rhamphomyia mirifica Frey, 1922 c g
 Rhamphomyia modesta Wahlberg, 1844 c g
 Rhamphomyia mollipes Frey, 1953 c g
 Rhamphomyia mollis Collin, 1933 c g
 Rhamphomyia monacha Bartak, 2002 c g
 Rhamphomyia monstrosa Bezzi, 1909 c g
 Rhamphomyia montana Oldenberg, 1915 c g
 Rhamphomyia morenae Strobl, 1899 c g
 Rhamphomyia morio Zetterstedt, 1838 c g
 Rhamphomyia multicolor Frey, 1952 c g
 Rhamphomyia multisinuosa Frey, 1950 c g
 Rhamphomyia murina Collin, 1926 c g
 Rhamphomyia mutabilis Loew, 1862 i c g
 Rhamphomyia naias Bartak, 2002 c g
 Rhamphomyia nakasujii Saigusa, 1963 c g
 Rhamphomyia nana Loew, 1861 i c g b
 Rhamphomyia nasoni Coquillett, 1895 i c g b
 Rhamphomyia nevadensis Lindner, 1962 c g
 Rhamphomyia nigraccipitrina Ito & Saigusa, 1967 c g
 Rhamphomyia nigricans Loew, 1864 i c g
 Rhamphomyia nigricauda Becker, 1907 c g
 Rhamphomyia nigrifemina Saigusa, 1964 c g
 Rhamphomyia nigripennis (Fabricius, 1794) c g
 Rhamphomyia nigripes Strobl, 1898 c g
 Rhamphomyia nigrita Zetterstedt, 1838 i c g
 Rhamphomyia nigromaculata Roser, 1840 c g
 Rhamphomyia nipponalpina Saigusa, 1964 c g
 Rhamphomyia nipponensis Frey, 1951 c g
 Rhamphomyia nitida Macquart, 1827 c g
 Rhamphomyia nitidifrons Ito & Saigusa, 1967 c g
 Rhamphomyia nitidistriata Saigusa, 1964 c g
 Rhamphomyia nitidivittata Macquart, 1846 i c g
 Rhamphomyia nitidolineata Frey, 1913 c g
 Rhamphomyia nitidula Zetterstedt, 1842 c g
 Rhamphomyia niveipennis Zetterstedt, 1838 c g
 Rhamphomyia nodipes Fallen, 1816 c g
 Rhamphomyia nordqvisti Holmgren, 1880 c g
 Rhamphomyia novecarolina Beutenmuller, 1913 i c g
 Rhamphomyia nox Oldenberg, 1917 c g
 Rhamphomyia nubes (Collin, 1969) c g
 Rhamphomyia nubigena Bezzi, 1904 c g
 Rhamphomyia nudipes Oldenberg, 1927 c g
 Rhamphomyia obscura Zetterstedt, 1838 c g
 Rhamphomyia obscurella Zetterstedt, 1842 c g
 Rhamphomyia obscuripennis Meigen, 1830 c g
 Rhamphomyia oedimana Bartak, 2002 c g
 Rhamphomyia olympiana Bartak, 1999 c g
 Rhamphomyia omissinervis Becker, 1900 c g
 Rhamphomyia omogoensis Saigusa, 1964 c g
 Rhamphomyia opacithorax Malloch, 1923 i c g
 Rhamphomyia optimalis Frey, 1953 c g
 Rhamphomyia ornithorhampha Frey, 1950 c g
 Rhamphomyia otiosa Coquillett, 1895 i c g
 Rhamphomyia ozernajensis Frey, 1922 c g
 Rhamphomyia ozerovi Bartak, 2003 c g
 Rhamphomyia pachymera Bigot, 1887 i c g
 Rhamphomyia pachymeriae Bartak & Kubik, 2009 c g
 Rhamphomyia pallistigma Roser, 1840 c g
 Rhamphomyia palmeni Frey, 1913 c g
 Rhamphomyia paradoxa Wahlberg, 1844 c g
 Rhamphomyia paragramma Bartak, 2002 c g
 Rhamphomyia paraleucoptera Frey, 1950 c g
 Rhamphomyia parva Coquillett, 1895 i c g
 Rhamphomyia parvicellulata Frey, 1922 g
 Rhamphomyia parvicellutata Frey, 1922 c g
 Rhamphomyia parvisinuata Bartak, 2002 c g
 Rhamphomyia parvula Frey, 1955 c g
 Rhamphomyia pectinata Loew, 1861 i c g
 Rhamphomyia pectoris Coquillett, 1895 i c g
 Rhamphomyia pendella Bartak, 2002 c g
 Rhamphomyia pendens Bartak, 2002 c g
 Rhamphomyia penicillata Bezzi, 1909 c g
 Rhamphomyia phemius Walker, 1849 i c g
 Rhamphomyia physoprocta Frey, 1913 c g
 Rhamphomyia piedmontensis Bartak, 2007 c g
 Rhamphomyia pilifer Meigen, 1838 c g
 Rhamphomyia piligeronis Coquillett, 1895 i c g
 Rhamphomyia pilimanicula Saigusa, 1964 c g
 Rhamphomyia pilosifacies Saigusa, 1963 c g
 Rhamphomyia pilostibia Bartak & Kubik, 2009 c g
 Rhamphomyia pkoronyi Bezzi, 1904 c g
 Rhamphomyia platycnemis Frey, 1922 c g
 Rhamphomyia pleciaeformis Frey, 1950 c g
 Rhamphomyia plumifera Zetterstedt, 1838 c g
 Rhamphomyia plumipes (Meigen, 1804) c g
 Rhamphomyia poissoni (Trehen, 1966) c g
 Rhamphomyia pokornyi Bezzi, 1904 g
 Rhamphomyia polita Loew, 1862 i c g
 Rhamphomyia politella Malloch, 1931 c g
 Rhamphomyia ponti Bartak, 2007 c g
 Rhamphomyia poplitea Wahlberg, 1844 c g
 Rhamphomyia porteri Brèthes, 1924 c g
 Rhamphomyia powelli Bartak, 2002 c g
 Rhamphomyia praecellens Frey, 1952 c g
 Rhamphomyia praecipua Bartak, 2002 c g
 Rhamphomyia praestans Frey, 1913 c g
 Rhamphomyia praeterita Bartak, 2002 c g
 Rhamphomyia prava Chillcott, 1959 i c g
 Rhamphomyia pretiosa Frey, 1953 c g
 Rhamphomyia priapulus Loew, 1861 i c g
 Rhamphomyia proclinata Frey, 1950 c g
 Rhamphomyia prodroma Bartak, 2002 c g
 Rhamphomyia pseudocrinita Strobl, 1909 c g
 Rhamphomyia pseudogibba Strobl, 1910 c g
 Rhamphomyia psychomorpha Saigusa, 1964 c g
 Rhamphomyia pteropyga Frey, 1951 c g
 Rhamphomyia pulla Loew, 1861 i c g
 Rhamphomyia pusilla Zetterstedt, 1838 c g
 Rhamphomyia pusio Loew, 1861 i c g
 Rhamphomyia pyctes Bartak, 2002 c g
 Rhamphomyia quinquelineata (Say, 1823) i c g
 Rhamphomyia rampazzii Bartak, 2006 c g
 Rhamphomyia rava Loew, 1962 i c g
 Rhamphomyia ravida Coquillett, 1895 i c g
 Rhamphomyia reflexa Zetterstedt, 1838 c g
 Rhamphomyia retortus Frey, 1955 c g
 Rhamphomyia rhodesiensis Collin, 1938 c g
 Rhamphomyia rhytmica Bartak, 2002 c g
 Rhamphomyia ringens Bartak, 2002 c g
 Rhamphomyia rivalis Bartak, 2002 c g
 Rhamphomyia robustior Frey, 1922 c g
 Rhamphomyia rogersi Bartak, 2002 c g
 Rhamphomyia rostrifera Bezzi, 1912 c g
 Rhamphomyia rotundicauda Saigusa, 1964 c g
 Rhamphomyia rufipes (Meigen, 1804) c g
 Rhamphomyia rufirostris Say, 1829 i c g
 Rhamphomyia rupestris Oldenberg, 1927 c g
 Rhamphomyia ryongaksanensis Bartak, 1997 c g
 Rhamphomyia saintbaumensis Bartak, 2007 c g
 Rhamphomyia samarkandensis Bartak, 2000 c g
 Rhamphomyia sanctimauritii Becker, 1887 c g
 Rhamphomyia sapporensis Matsumura, 1915 c g
 Rhamphomyia sareptana Frey, 1950 c g
 Rhamphomyia sauteri Bezzi, 1912 c g
 Rhamphomyia scaura Bartak, 2002 c g
 Rhamphomyia scaurissima Wheeler, 1896 i c g
 Rhamphomyia sciarina (Fallen, 1816) c g
 Rhamphomyia scitula Frey, 1922 c g
 Rhamphomyia scolopacea (Say, 1823) i c g
 Rhamphomyia scopifer Bartak, 2002 c g
 Rhamphomyia scutellaris Coquillett, 1895 i c g
 Rhamphomyia sellacrinita Bartak, 2007 c g
 Rhamphomyia sellaensis Bartak, 1999 c g
 Rhamphomyia sellata Loew, 1861 i c g
 Rhamphomyia semipellucida Frey, 1950 c g
 Rhamphomyia seposita Collin, 1933 c g
 Rhamphomyia septembris White, 1916 c g
 Rhamphomyia serpentata Loew, 1856 c g
 Rhamphomyia setitibia Frey, 1950 c g
 Rhamphomyia setosa Coquillett, 1895 i c g
 Rhamphomyia setulosa Saigusa, 1964 c g
 Rhamphomyia shirayuki Saigusa, 1964 c g
 Rhamphomyia siebecki Strobl, 1898 c g
 Rhamphomyia similata Malloch, 1919 i c g
 Rhamphomyia simplex Zetterstedt, 1849 c g
 Rhamphomyia slovaki Bartak, 1997 c g
 Rhamphomyia soccata Loew, 1861 i c g
 Rhamphomyia sociabilis (Williston, 1893) i c g
 Rhamphomyia soleata Melander, 1965 i c g
 Rhamphomyia sordida Loew, 1861 i c g
 Rhamphomyia sororia Frey, 1953 c g
 Rhamphomyia spatenkai Bartak, 2000 c g
 Rhamphomyia spectabilis Frey, 1922 c g
 Rhamphomyia speighti Bartak, 2006 c g
 Rhamphomyia sphaerophora Frey, 1950 c g
 Rhamphomyia sphenoptera Loew, 1873 c g
 Rhamphomyia spinipes (Fallen, 1816) c g
 Rhamphomyia spiniventris Saigusa, 1964 c g
 Rhamphomyia spinosipes Oldenberg, 1915 c g
 Rhamphomyia spirifera Frey, 1955 c g
 Rhamphomyia stackelbergi Frey, 1950 c g
 Rhamphomyia stigmosa Macquart, 1827 c g
 Rhamphomyia strobli Bartak, 1985 c g
 Rhamphomyia stylata Coquillett, 1895 i c g
 Rhamphomyia subacuta Bartak, 2002 c g
 Rhamphomyia subcinarescens Collin, 1926 c g
 Rhamphomyia subdolomitica Bartak, 1981 c g
 Rhamphomyia subglaucella Frey, 1922 c g
 Rhamphomyia subpusilla Frey, 1951 c g
 Rhamphomyia subsultans Frey, 1922 c g
 Rhamphomyia sudigeronis Coquillett, 1895 i c g b
 Rhamphomyia sulcata (Meigen, 1804) c g
 Rhamphomyia sulcatella Collin, 1926 c g
 Rhamphomyia sulcatina Collin, 1926 c g
 Rhamphomyia sutibialis Frey, 1950 c g
 Rhamphomyia tachulanensis Saigusa, 1966 c g
 Rhamphomyia taenia Ito & Saigusa, 1967 c g
 Rhamphomyia taimyrensis Frey, 1950 c g
 Rhamphomyia takagii Saigusa, 1963 c g
 Rhamphomyia takahashii Saigusa, 1963 c g
 Rhamphomyia tarsata Meigen, 1822 c g
 Rhamphomyia taylori Smith, 1971 c g
 Rhamphomyia teberdana Bartak, 1983 c g
 Rhamphomyia tenuipes Becker, 1907 c g
 Rhamphomyia tenuiterfilata Becker, 1900 c g
 Rhamphomyia tersa Coquillett, 1895 i c g
 Rhamphomyia testacea Loew, 1862 i c g
 Rhamphomyia thaiciliata Bartak & Kubik, 2008 c g
 Rhamphomyia tibialis Meigen, 1822 c g
 Rhamphomyia tibiella Zetterstedt, 1842 c g
 Rhamphomyia tienshanensis Bartak, 2000 c g
 Rhamphomyia tipularia Fallen, 1816 c g
 Rhamphomyia tolteca Wheeler & Melander, 1901 c g
 Rhamphomyia tonsa Loew, 1871 c g
 Rhamphomyia transversipyga Frey, 1950 c g
 Rhamphomyia triangulifera Bartak, 2002 c g
 Rhamphomyia trichopleura Saigusa, 1964 c g
 Rhamphomyia trigemina Oldenberg, 1927 c g
 Rhamphomyia trilineata Zetterstedt, 1859 c g
 Rhamphomyia trimaculata Saigusa, 1963 c g
 Rhamphomyia triseta Saigusa, 1963 c g
 Rhamphomyia tristis Walker, 1857 i c g
 Rhamphomyia tristriolata Nowicki, 1868 c g
 Rhamphomyia truncata Frey, 1922 c g
 Rhamphomyia tuberifemur Bartak, 2004 c g
 Rhamphomyia tumiditarsis Oldenberg, 1917 c g
 Rhamphomyia turneri Bartak, 2002 c g
 Rhamphomyia tympanica Bezzi, 1909 c g
 Rhamphomyia umbilicata Loew, 1861 i c g
 Rhamphomyia umbripennis Meigen, 1822 c g
 Rhamphomyia umbripes Becker, 1887 c g
 Rhamphomyia umbrosa Loew, 1864 i c g
 Rhamphomyia unguiculata Frey, 1913 c g
 Rhamphomyia ungulata Loew, 1861 i g
 Rhamphomyia unimaculata Loew, 1862 i c g
 Rhamphomyia uralensis Becker, 1915 c g
 Rhamphomyia ursina Oldenberg, 1915 c g
 Rhamphomyia ursinella Melander, 1927 i c g
 Rhamphomyia uzbekistanica Bartak, 2000 c g
 Rhamphomyia valga Coquillett, 1895 i c g
 Rhamphomyia vara Loew, 1861 i c g
 Rhamphomyia variabilis (Fallen, 1816) c g
 Rhamphomyia verae Smith, 1962 c g
 Rhamphomyia vernalis Saigusa, 1964 c g
 Rhamphomyia versicolor Chillcott, 1959 i c g
 Rhamphomyia vesiculosa (Fallen, 1816) c g
 Rhamphomyia vicana (Harris, 1780) c g
 Rhamphomyia villipes Coquillett, 1900 i c g
 Rhamphomyia villosella Bartak, 2002 c g
 Rhamphomyia villosipes Bezzi, 1905 c g
 Rhamphomyia virgata Coquillett, 1895 i c g
 Rhamphomyia vittata Loew, 1862 i c g
 Rhamphomyia vockerothi Bartak, 2002 c g
 Rhamphomyia wagneri Bartak, 1998 c g
 Rhamphomyia weedii Coquillett i c g
 Rhamphomyia wuroentausi Frey, 1922 c g
 Rhamphomyia xanthomera Bartak, 2002 c g
 Rhamphomyia yasumatsui Saigusa, 1963 c g
 Rhamphomyia zaitsevi Becker, 1915 c g

Data sources: i = ITIS, c = Catalogue of Life, g = GBIF, b = Bugguide.net

References

Rhamphomyia